Lasse Korhonen is a Finnish ice hockey player who played professionally in Finland for Tappara of the SM-liiga.

References

External links

Living people
Tappara players
Finnish ice hockey defencemen
Year of birth missing (living people)